"Let's Get Away from It All" is a popular song with music by Matt Dennis and lyrics by Tom Adair, published in 1941.

The song is most commonly associated with Frank Sinatra (who had a hit with it as a member of The Pied Pipers while he was a part of Tommy Dorsey's orchestra  and later for his Come Fly with Me album), but many others have recorded it and it is considered a standard of traditional pop music.

Other recordings
 Martha Tilton and Harry Babbitt - a single release in 1950.
 Patti Page - Let's Get Away from It All (1958).
 Della Reese - for her album Della (1960)
 Louis Prima and Keely Smith - for their album Together (1960).
 Jo Stafford - for her album Getting Sentimental over Tommy Dorsey (1963)
 Four King Cousins - for their album Introducing the Four King Cousins (1968)
 Rockapella (with Elliott Kerman on lead vocals)  - Where in the World Is Carmen Sandiego? (1992) and Lucky Seven (1996)
 Rosemary Clooney - Still on the Road (1994)

In popular culture
During 1966 to 1969, The Supremes (Diana Ross, Florence Ballard, Mary Wilson) performed this song as part of a medley with "The Lady Is a Tramp" in nightclubs such as the Copacabana in 1967 and Roostertail in 1966. The 1968 album, Live at London's Talk of the Town, had the song included with the same medley.

References

Songs with music by Matt Dennis
Songs written by Tom Adair
1941 songs